Tie Ning (born September 1957) is a Chinese author based in Beijing, China. She has, since 2006, been the president of the China Writers Association and is a member of the 18th Central Committee of the Communist Party of China. Her works include short stories, "Ah, Xiangxue", The Red Shirt Without Buttons, "June's Big Topic", Wheat Straw Stack, Cotton Stack, "The Village Road Takes Me Home", Rose Door, "How Long is Forever" and Da Yu Nü (Big-Bath Woman).

On 10 March 2023, Tie was elected as Vice Chairwoman of the Standing Committee of the 14th National People's Congress of the People's Republic of China.

Background 
Tie Ning traces her ancestry to Hebei province. In 1975, after graduation from high school in Baoding, Tie Ning went to Hebei Province to experience rural life. In 1979, she returned to Baoding and worked in the Baoding Branch of the Chinese Federation of Art and Literature as novel editor. In 1984, she worked in the Creative Writing Workshop of Hebei. Now she is the chairperson of the Writers Association of China, a position no woman had ever held before. On 4 December 2016 Tie Ning was subsequently elected as chairwoman of the China Federation of Literary and Art Circles, replacing Sun Jiazheng, in addition to being reelected as chairperson of the Writers Association of China.

Awards 
Tie Ning started publishing her works in 1975. In 1982, her short story "Ah, Xiangxue" won a national award. In 1984, her medium-length novel The Red Shirt Without Buttons and her short story "June's Big Topic" won national awards. Since 1980, Tie Ning has published Path in the Night and other collections of short stories and novellas. Her Wheat Straw Stack won an award as the 1986/1987 "Middle-length Novel Offprint". She won the Lao She Literary Award in 2000 and 2002.

Style 
Her early works mainly depicted ordinary people and daily life, exquisitely portraying her characters' inner worlds, and reflecting people's dreams and pursuits and the absurdity and suffering in their lives.

In 1986 and 1988, she published two novels, Wheat Straw Stack and Cotton Stack respectively, both reflecting ancient history and culture and dealing with women's experiences. After 1986, her novels changed direction to reflection on traditional Chinese cultures, with polysemous themes and varied techniques. In 1988, she wrote her first full-length novel, Rose Door, in which she departed from her harmonious and idealistic poetic style, and displayed the dark side of life through the competition for survival among women of several generations.

Works 
Ah, Xiangxue (1982)

This is a story about a pure and pretty country girl, Xiangxue, "fragrant snow" in Chinese. Xiangxue lives in a village in the mountains. Every day, a train from outside the mountains stops at the village just for a minute. Xiangxue and other country girls each take a small basket of eggs to the train when it stops and exchange them for things they want, because they cannot get what they need in the village. Xiangxue carries the basket onto the train, and when she sees a pencil box beside a city girl of her age, she immediately wants it. She offers her for it a full basket of eggs; the exchange is made. It opens up a door to the outside world for her. The story shows the country girl's simplicity and her yearning for civilization.

The Village Road Takes Me Home (1983)

Tie Ning is critical of the masculine model as a basis for thought about opposition to the power of the party or state and for assuming responsibility over women's lives. This model is embodied in two male characters who both want to marry the female protagonist because they feel responsible for her earlier marriage to a peasant, which left her a widow and prevented her from returning to the city after the policy of sending educated youths to rural China ended.

In her story about the female protagonist's choice between the two, which entails the significant and ideologically loaded choice between the city and the countryside, Tie Ning reveals the complicity of the masculine model in the party's and state's dominant ideology, despite its apparent opposition to it. In its place, she offers the protagonist's feminine view, that one should determine one's life-course based on one's own needs, desires, and abilities, rather than with reference to either opposition to or compliance with the party-state and its ideology.

How Long is Forever (1999)

Bai Daxing is a typical girl brought up in Beijing's Hutongs. She is a kind girl who is always willing to offer help to everybody around her without any consideration of her own interests. But the innocent Bai is cheated repeatedly by the friends who have received her help and love. The people she trusts most make use of her purity and warm-heartedness, leaving Bai with less and less. Bai's personality does not seem to be suited to the times. Tie uses Bai to emphasize how far modern society is from perfection.

The Bathing Women (2000)

Tie Ning's semi-autobiographical novel illustrates how difficult it is for Chinese writers to ignore the national allegory. Set in the world of writing and publishing, the novel relates the story of a young woman and of two older men who are both in love with her. The narrative alternates between first- and third-person as the protagonist connects her love affair with her memories of her teenage years, showing how she achieves strength through the interweaving of her private and public lives.

Complete works

  "The Works of Tie Ning" (5 volumes), Jiangsu Literature and Art Publishing House, (1996)
  "The Grass Heap"，novella collection，
  "Burying", novella collection, 
  "June Topics", short story collection, 
  "The Rose Door", Novel, 
  "A Woman’s Nights", essay collection, 
  "Collected Works of Tie Ning" (9 volumes), People's Literature Publishing House, (2006)
  "The Rose Door", novel,  
  "The Bathing Women", novel, 
  "Rainless City", novel, 
  "How Long is Forever", novella collection, 
  "Afternoon Cliffs", novella collection, 
  "The Guests Have Arrived!", short story collection, 
  "The Chocolate Handprint", short story collection, 
  "Walking Dreams", essay collection, 
  "As Clean and Lovely as Paper-Cut", essay collection, 
  "Clumsy Flower", novel, People's Literature Publishing House, (2006), 
  "The Twelfth Night", short story and novella collection, Hong Kong Ming Pao Press, (2007), 
  "Starting with Dreams – The Essays of Tie Ning", essay collection, Hunan Literature and Art Publishing House, (2007), 
  "The Beauty of Amazement", essay collection, Writers Publishing House, (2009), 
  "A Return to Joy", essay collection, Henan Literature and Art Publishing House, (2009), 
  "The Chocolate Handprint", Hong Kong Ming Pao Press, (2009), 
  "The Essays of Tie Ning" (illustrated edition), essay collection, People's Literature Publishing House, (2009), 
  "The Winged Bridge – Essays on Culture", essay collection, The Commercial Press, (2010), 
 "How Long is Forever" (English version), short story and novella collection, Shanghai Press and Publishing Development Company/Reader's Digest Association, (2010), 
  "The Butterfly Smiles – Student Readings Selected by the Masters", short story and essay collection, Liaoning People's Publishing House, (2012), 
 "The Bathing Women (English version)", Simon & Schuster, US, (2012), 
 "The Bathing Women (English version)", Harper Collins, UK, (2012), 
  "Peasants' Ball", essay collection, Thread-Binding Books Publishing House, (2012), 
  "Irina’s Hat", selected stories, New Land, Taiwan, (2013), 
  "How Long is Forever" (Turkish version), novella, Turkey, (2013), 
  "How Long is Forever" (Thai version, translated by Princess Maha Chakri Sirindhorn), novella, Nanmee Books, (2014),

References

External links
 Tie Ning
 Tie Ning, China.org.cn
 Tie Ning, DragonSource.com
 Privacy or Allegory: Rewriting Personal Memory in Tie Ning's Big-bath woman, CHEN Xiaoming

1957 births
Living people
Chinese women poets
Pseudonymous women writers
Short story writers from Beijing
20th-century Chinese women writers
21st-century Chinese women writers
People's Republic of China poets
Poets from Beijing
Chinese women in politics
Chinese women short story writers
Lao She Literary Award
20th-century Chinese short story writers
21st-century Chinese short story writers
People's Republic of China short story writers
20th-century pseudonymous writers
21st-century pseudonymous writers